Ronald MacDonald (June 2, 1835 – September 16, 1912) was a Canadian Roman Catholic priest, educator, and Bishop of Harbour Grace, Newfoundland from 1881 to 1906. In 1906, he was appointed Titular Archbishop of Gortyna.

References
 

1835 births
1912 deaths
19th-century Roman Catholic bishops in Canada
20th-century Roman Catholic archbishops in Canada
Roman Catholic bishops of Grand Falls